CUC may refer to:

Education 
 Canadian University College, a private Seventh-day Adventist degree-granting institution and teacher's college in Lacombe, Alberta, Canada
 Catholic University College, Kensington, a 19th Century college of higher education
 Ciudad Universitaria de Caracas, the Spanish name of University City of Caracas, a World Heritage Site and the college campus of Universidad Central de Venezuela
 Claremont University Consortium, a group of seven colleges in California, USA
 Columbia Union College, a former name of Washington Adventist University, a liberal arts university located in Takoma Park, Maryland, USA
 Combined Universities in Cornwall, a project to provide higher education in Cornwall, UK
 Communication University of China, a university in Beijing, China
 Concordia University Chicago, a private Lutheran university in River Forest, Illinois, USA

Organisations 
 Canadian Unitarian Council, the national body for Unitarian Universalist congregations in Canada
 Canadian Unity Council, a former non-profit organization whose mission was the promotion of Canadian unity
 Caribbean Utilities, a utilities company based in the Cayman Islands
 Comité de Unidad Campesina, the Spanish name for the former Committee for Peasant Unity in Guatemala
 CUC Broadcasting, a former Canadian media company
 CUC International, a former consumer services conglomerate involved in a 1998 accounting scandal

Other 
 Canadian Ultimate Championships, a national tournament of Ultimate in Canada
 Cuban convertible peso, formerly one of two official currencies in Cuba, by ISO 4217 code
 CUC, the IATA airport code for Camilo Daza International Airport, Cúcuta, Colombia
 CUC, codon for the amino acid leucine